Hon. Harold Burge Robson (10 March 1888 – 13 October 1964) was a British soldier, barrister and Liberal Party politician.

Background
Robson was born the son of former Liberal Minister Lord Robson. He was educated at Eton and New College, Oxford.

Professional career
Robson was called to the Bar in 1910. He was awarded the Croix de Guerre during World War I.

Political career
Robson was Liberal candidate at the 1923 Berwick-upon-Tweed by-election. This was a Liberal seat which had been won by a supporter of the Coalition Government in 1922. In the by-election, a Unionist won the seat. He was Liberal candidate again for the Berwick-upon-Tweed division at the 1923 General Election, when he came within 2,000 votes of defeating the Unionist. He fought the seat a third time in 1924 without success. He was Liberal candidate for the South Shields division at the 1929 General Election. This was a Liberal seat won previously due to the absence of a Unionist candidate. This time a Unionist intervened and he lost the seat to the Labour Party by just 40 votes. He did not stand for parliament again. He was Vice-Chairman of Northumberland County Council from 1935 to 1937.

Electoral record

Other
Robson was a Member of the Committee of Management of the Royal National Life-Boat Institution from 1936 and Vice-President from 1955.

See also
1923 Berwick-upon-Tweed by-election

References

1888 births
1964 deaths
Liberal Party (UK) parliamentary candidates
People educated at Eton College
Alumni of New College, Oxford
Members of the Inner Temple
British Army personnel of World War I
Recipients of the Croix de Guerre 1914–1918 (France)
Northumberland Hussars officers
English barristers